The Heritage Classic was an outdoor ice hockey game played on November 22, 2003, in Edmonton, Alberta, Canada, between the Edmonton Oilers and the Montreal Canadiens. It was the first National Hockey League (NHL) game to be played outdoors as a part of regular season play. The Heritage Classic concept was modeled after the success of the "Cold War" game between the University of Michigan and Michigan State University in 2001.  The game was given the tagline "A November to Remember".

The event took place in Edmonton's Commonwealth Stadium in front of a crowd of 57,167, despite temperatures of close to −18 °C, −30 °C (−22 °F) with wind chill. It was held to commemorate the 25th anniversary of the Edmonton Oilers joining the NHL in 1979 and the 20th anniversary of their first Stanley Cup win in 1984. The CBC television broadcast drew 2.747 million viewers in Canada, the second-highest audience for a regular-season NHL game. This was the first NHL game broadcast in HD on CBC.

First, the MegaStars game was played between some of the best former players from both clubs. The Oilers were represented by the best players from their 1980s dynasty, led by Wayne Gretzky. The Canadiens were represented by players from their 1970s dynasty, led by Guy Lafleur, and a few members of the 1986 and 1993 championship squads. Both teams were composed of players who had won Stanley Cups with the Oilers or Canadiens, except for the Oilers' first NHL captain, Ron Chipperfield, and the Canadiens' Russ Courtnall, who Rejean Houle said was selected for his speed. Cam Connor and Mark Napier were the only players that played for both the Oilers and the Canadiens during their NHL careers; both played for the Canadiens during the game. Mark Messier, the only active player at the time, received special permission from the New York Rangers front office to compete for Edmonton in the game and was the only player in the game to wear a helmet. The MegaStars game consisted of two 15-minute halves rather than three 20-minute periods, and was won by the Oilers by a score of 2–0. After the game, Messier jokingly called the low-scoring contest "a typical Oilers win," a reference to the numerous high-scoring games of the Oilers' heyday in the 1980s.

The second game was an official NHL regular season contest between the Edmonton Oilers and the Montreal Canadiens. Montreal won the game 4–3. Richard Zednik of the Canadiens scored the first goal of the game, and also scored the game-winner. Goaltender Jose Theodore wore a Canadiens tuque over the top of his goalie mask.

The game was released to DVD by the CBC, and included special features such as player interviews.

Following the success of the Heritage Classic, in 2008 the league began a series of Winter Classics, an outdoor regular season game played annually on New Year's Day, which to date have all taken place in American-based NHL cities. The first NHL game to be played outdoors was an exhibition game on September 27, 1991, when the Los Angeles Kings played the New York Rangers outside Caesars Palace in Las Vegas. The next outdoor game to be awarded by the league to a Canadian-based NHL city was the 2011 Heritage Classic in Calgary, part of the Heritage Classic series of games.

Game summary 

Number in parenthesis represents the player's total in goals or assists to that point of the season

Team rosters 

 Steve Valiquette dressed for the Edmonton Oilers as the back-up goalie and did not enter the game.   Mathieu Garon dressed for the Montreal Canadiens as the back-up goalie and did not enter the game.

Scratches
Montreal Canadiens: Donald Audette (ankle), Ron Hainsey (healthy), Marcel Hossa (healthy)
Edmonton Oilers: Alexei Semenov (healthy), Tony Salmelainen (healthy), Peter Sarno (healthy)

Officials
 Referees — Dan Marouelli, Kevin Pollock
 Linesmen — Greg Devorski, Randy Mitton

See also
2003–04 Edmonton Oilers season
2003–04 Montreal Canadiens season
List of outdoor ice hockey games
List of ice hockey games with highest attendance
Pond hockey

References

External links
 CBC build-up: Video Game Showdown
 Fuhr, Ranford shine at Heritage Classic
 Sabres to host Penguins at Ralph Wilson Stadium
 Ice is nice at Fenway for Bruins

Heritage Classic
Edmonton Oilers games
Ice hockey competitions in Edmonton
2003 Heritage Classic
2003
2000s in Edmonton
November 2003 sports events in Canada